Dame Janet Paraskeva  (born 28 May 1946, Newport, Monmouthshire, Wales) is a British government official.

She was appointed as the First Civil Service Commissioner on 1 January 2006. On 15 November 2007 Paraskeva was announced by Peter Hain, Secretary of State for Work and Pensions, as first Chair of the Child Maintenance and Enforcement Commission. Her appointment, which lasted four years, took effect on 19 November 2007.

Paraskeva began her career as a science and mathematics teacher in 1967. After graduating from the Open University in 1983 with a social sciences degree, Paraskeva joined HM Inspector of Schools where she served until 1988. She has served as chief executive at the Law Society's Council and was Director for England of the National Lottery Charities Board as well as being the force being setting up and running the England operation, awarding more than £1.5bn to voluntary organisations. Paraskeva has also served as a magistrate and as a member of the Youth Justice Board.

She is affiliated with ChildLine, Ofsted and the British Youth Council. Since 2000, she has been a trustee of the civic group Common Purpose.

On 5 September 2005, she was appointed to the board of Britain's Serious Organised Crime Agency as a non-executive director. In February 2006, Olympics Minister Tessa Jowell appointed Janet Paraskeva as Chair of the new Olympic Lottery Distributor (OLD), and she served as Chair until the body was dissolved in March 2013. The OLD came into existence in July 2005, following London's success in being selected as the city to host the 2012 Summer Olympics. The body's key role was to ensure proper, timely and effective distribution of a £1.8 billion Lottery contribution and to fund the provision of facilities, services and functions required for the staging of the London 2012 Summer Olympics and Paralympic Games.

On 6 July 2010, Prime Minister David Cameron announced that Paraskeva would be one of three members of an inquiry to determine whether British intelligence officers were complicit in the torture of detainees, including those from the Guantanamo Bay detention camp or subject to rendition flights. Paraskeva joined the Privy Council to permit easier access to secret information.

Paraskeva has been a strong advocate for gay and lesbian rights in the United Kingdom. She has stated her intention, under the Civil Partnership Act 2004, to enter into a civil partnership with her partner of more than a decade, whom she will only refer to as 'Mary'. Paraskeva has two children from her first marriage.

In 2006, Paraskeva, along with numerous other Greek Cypriots, was featured in a book by Kyriakos Tsioupras It's all Greek to them, focusing on Cypriots who have had substantial influence within their communities.

Awards & honours
 In 1978, she was awarded the Robert Schuman Silver Medal for European Unity.
 Paraskeva was appointed Dame Commander of the Order of the British Empire (DBE) in the 2010 Birthday Honours "for public service".

References

External links
The Guardian
Civil Service biography
Cabinet Office release
Biodata

1946 births
Living people
Welsh people of Greek Cypriot descent
British LGBT civil servants
People from Newport, Wales
Dames Commander of the Order of the British Empire
Members of the Privy Council of the United Kingdom